Bombing of Rabaul may refer to the following engagements of World War II
Bombing of Rabaul (1942)
Bombing of Rabaul (November 1943)